SFOF may refer to:

 Space Flight Operations Facility, a space control building in Pasadena, California
 Superior fronto-occipital fasciculus, a controversial nerve bundle in the brain